Fungimap Inc is an Australian non-profit, citizen-science organization founded in 1996 dedicated to raising the profile of Australia's incredible fungal diversity. Fungimap's focus is on macrofungi in the natural environment. Fungimap headquarters is located in the National Herbarium of Victoria, Royal Botanic Gardens Melbourne, South Yarra, Victoria.

Citizen science

Fungimap maintains the National Australian Fungimap Database (NAFD) containing over 100,000 records and 6,500 images of fungi from over 700 contributors nationwide. This valuable resource is used for research, conservation, and policy purposes and has been provided to the Australian National Heritage Assessment Tool (ANHAT), state and Commonwealth environment agencies, and the Atlas of Living Australia. Anyone can contribute fungi records to Fungimap; submitting a fungi record often follows the below criteria:

• Species name

• Location: using Lat/Long or GPS and a text description

• Date seen

• Photographic details: file name of the relevant photo and the permission you would like to grant to Fungimap in relation to the image

• Habitat, e.g. garden, rainforest, eucalypt woodland, nearest tree

• Substrate (what is it growing on) e.g. tree trunk (species?)/ fallen log (species?)/ on soil/ other significant details.

Organisational structure

Fungimap is a not-for-profit organization with an independent Management Committee with representation from across Australia. Committee members have diverse backgrounds and interests including field mycology, fungi recording and inventory, fungi photography and painting, education, conservation, taxonomy and ecology.
Several subcommittees assist with carrying out the aims of the organization, as set out in the Constitution and elaborated in the Strategic Plan. There are subcommittees for Data and Images, Conservation and Biodiversity and Funding and Promotion, as well as the organizing committees for the particular Conferences and Festivals that are being planned. Fungimap has a staff of two part-time Coordinators, a dedicated team of office volunteers, and a wide network of people submitting data and images. The Management Committee is elected annually at the AGM. For subcommittees, new members are always welcome, to contribute their skills and ideas to help make Fungimap even stronger.

Sponsors

Principal Sponsor:

Royal Botanic Gardens Melbourne provides significant in-kind assistance to Fungimap Inc. through hosting the Fungimap office and providing IT and administrative support for Fungimap staff and volunteers.

Major Sponsors:

• The Norman Wettenhall Foundation provided funding in 2008 towards the Fungimap Fact Sheet Database, which powered the online Fungi Field Guide. The Foundation again provided funding in 2012 to support workshops and forays at the VIIth Fungimap Conference in Rawson, Victoria from May 23–27, 2013.

• The Tasmanian Fungi Festival 2012 was part-organised by NRM South and supported by the Australian Government's Caring for Our Country. The Old Woolstore Apartment Hotel was the Principal Sponsor and Official Hotel of the Tasmanian Fungi Festival.

• Cradle Coast NRM provided funding to support a joint Fungimap and Central North Field Naturalists fungal foray at Corinna in the Tarkine in early May, 2012, and then again in May 2013 supported the publication of the Fungimap Guide to Surveying Fungi in Australia and a training workshop on surveying techniques held in Burnie, Tasmania.

• The Atlas of Living Australia, an Australian Government Initiative, made possible the integration of Fungimap's records into the ALA's biodiversity information management system through project grant funding in 2011. For more information, click here.

Publications

Fungi Down Under - The Fungimap guide to Australian fungi:

Written by Pat and Ed Grey, and edited by Leon Costermans.

References

Environmental organisations based in Australia